is a Milon's Secret Castle’s Puzzle game released for the Nintendo DS on July 6, 2006, only in Japan. It was developed by Takumi Corporation and published by Hudson Soft.

Story
Milon and his friends were having fun until Ochiai appears to make fun of them, starting the rivalry with Milon.

Gameplay
Similar to Puzzle Bobble games, the game consists on popping the bubbles of the same color. However, each bubble color group requires a specific placing to be popped:
 Blue: A vertical line of 3 or more. 
 Red: A horizontal line of 3 or more.
 Yellow: A complete 2X2 square.

Each character have different walking speed, bubble speed, scores for combos and scores for eliminate the most bubbles at the same time.

Reception
On release, Famicom Tsūshin scored the game a 25 out of 40.

References

2006 video games
Hudson Soft games
Japan-exclusive video games
Multiplayer and single-player video games
Nintendo DS games
Nintendo DS-only games
Puzzle video games
Takumi Corporation games
Video games developed in Japan